The Guys Choice: Perfect 10, also known as 2016 Guys Choice, is an awards show that was taped on June 4 at the Sony Pictures Studios in Culver City, California and aired on Spike on June 9, 2016. This year's theme was set to a 'Rat Pack' Las Vegas theme in honor of the show's 10th anniversary. A last minute tribute to Muhammad Ali, who died the day before the taping on June 3, was included with a special performance from John Legend and Andra Day.

Performers
Robin Thicke – "Give It 2 U"
John Legend & Andra Day – "Greatest Love of All"
a Performed the song with Black Daddy before Gigi Hadid accepted Our New Girlfriend.

House artist

Black Daddy

Presenters
Chrissy Teigen – welcomed the audience to the show
Kendrick Lamar – presented Athlete of the Decade
Rob Riggle – presented Our New Girlfriend
Norman Reedus – presented Outlaw
Adam DeVine and Zac Efron – presented Hot & Funny
Zac Efron – presented Guy Movie Hall of Fame
RZA – presented Unstoppable Jock
Dermot Mulroney and Matt Bomer – presented Woman of the Decade
John Legend – presented the Muhammad Ali tribute and performance
Sarah Hyland – presented Comedy MVP
Clint Eastwood – presented Hero
Terry Crews – presented Jean-Claude Gahd Dam
Christian Slater – presented Virtuoso
Robert De Niro – presented Guys of the Decade

Honorees

Athlete of the Decade
Kobe Bryant

Our New Girlfriend
Gigi Hadid

Outlaw
Kiefer Sutherland

Hot & Funny
Anna Kendrick

Guy Movie Hall of Fame
Casino

Unstoppable Jock
Von Miller

Woman of the Decade
Julia Roberts

Comedy MVP
Adam DeVine

Hero
Alek Skarlatos, Anthony Sadler and Spencer Stone

Jean-Claude Gahd Dam
Olivia Munn

Virtuoso
James Franco

Guys of the Decade
Ben Affleck & Matt Damon

References

External links
Guy's Choice official site

Spike (TV network) original programming
2016 in California